Ecopower or EcoPower is a portmanteau word.  It may refer to:
A design feature of the Saab H automobile engine;
A system developed by Pratt & Whitney to clean the interior working parts and surfaces of jet engines
Ecopower (cooperative): a Belgian cooperative offering renewable energy.